Karma Shenjing (カーマ・シェンジン) is a visual kei rock group based in the Kansai area of Japan that formed in November 2002.

History
In 2005, the band debuted overseas in the United States at Jrock Connection 2005 and returned the next year in 2006.  They also performed at FanimeCon in 2007.

Members
Rairin (來鈴), Vocals, was born December 20 in Hyougo-ken.
Ikuto (幾都), Guitar and Synthesizer, was born February 13 in Tottori-ken.
Shino (祠乃), Guitar, was born February 14 in Okayama-ken.
Sakika (咲華), Bass, was born August 22 in Yamagata-ken.

Discography
Rinne Jigokuhensouzu (Demo CD 2003-4-26)
Kousousaisai Reiga (Demo CD 2004-2-13)
Shikirakuyou Yumezuki (Demo CD 2005-8-28)
Ruten Rinne (Album Japan: 2006-1-25, USA: 2006-11-25)
The Seal of Reincarnation -USA Limited Version (Live DVD 2006-11-25)

References

External links
 Official website
 Official MySpace

Musical quartets
Japanese musical groups
Visual kei musical groups
Japanese rock music groups